Asher Yasbincek (born 2000 or 2001) is an Australian actress, known for her role as Harper McLean in the Netflix series Heartbreak High. Yasbincek made her television debut in the recurring role of Rose in serial drama The Heights. She then appeared in the comedy-drama film Rams (2020) and had a supporting role in How to Please a Woman (2022). Yasbincek secured her breakthrough role in Heartbreak High while she was working in traffic control. She shaved her head on-screen for the role in one of her first scenes. For her portrayal of Harper, Yasbincek received a nomination for the AACTA Audience Choice Award for Best Actress. She also stars in the four-part miniseries Riptide as Hannah Lane.

Early life
Yasbincek was born in Perth, and she attended Mount Lawley Senior High School. She wanted to become an actor after appearing in a school play as "an evil enchanter with a cackling laugh" when she was six years old. She found that she became addicted to having an audience laugh with her. As of 2022, Yasbincek lives in Melbourne.

Career
Yasbincek made her television debut in the Australian serial drama The Heights, playing the recurring role of Rose. Yasbincek found the role "extremely enjoyable", as she was allowed to play with the character and experience her growth alongside the audience. Yasbincek's made her feature film debut in Jeremy Sims' 2020 comedy-drama Rams, which was filmed in Western Australia and stars Sam Neill and Michael Caton. She guested in an episode of The Wilds, and has a supporting role as Chloe in How to Please a Woman (2022).

Yasbincek stars as Harper McLean in the 2022 Netflix comedy-drama series Heartbreak High, which is a reboot of the 1994 series. Yasbincek's character Harper breaks up with her friend Amerie Wadia (Ayesha Madon) at the start of the series, while their map detailing the sexual exploits of the students in their year at school goes viral. Yasbincek was working in traffic control when she was cast as Harper. She admitted to "binging" almost all of the original series after joining the reboot. Her character has a buzz cut and the actress shaved her head on-screen in one of the first scenes she filmed for the series. She told Clare Rigden of The West Australian that it "100 per cent" helped her get into character. Describing Harper, she stated "On surface level, Harper seems to be really aggressive and quite angry, and that's not untrue, but I think it's her shield that she’s putting up. As the series progresses, you get to see a little bit more of what's underneath that." For her role in Heartbreak High, Yasbincek received a nomination for the AACTA Audience Choice Award for Best Actress, along with her co-stars Ayesha Madon and Chloe Hayden. The Daily Telegraph named Yasbincek as one of their Breakout Aussie Stars of 2022 for her role. Heartbreak High was picked up for a second season, after the first amassed over 42.6 million hours viewed in the three weeks after its premiere.

Yasbincek was cast as Hannah Lane in the four-part miniseries Riptide in July 2022, alongside British actress Jo Joyner and Australian actor Peter O'Brien. The series was filmed on-location in Melbourne and was broadcast in late December in the UK.

Filmography

References

External links

Living people
21st-century Australian actresses
Actresses from Perth, Western Australia
Australian television actresses
Australian film actresses
Year of birth missing (living people)